Events in the year 1638 in the Spanish Netherlands and Prince-bishopric of Liège (predecessor states of modern Belgium).

Incumbents

Habsburg Netherlands
Monarch – Philip IV, King of Spain and Duke of Brabant, of Luxembourg, etc.

Governor General – Cardinal-Infante Ferdinand of Austria

Prince-Bishopric of Liège
Prince-Bishop – Ferdinand of Bavaria

Events
 23 January – Exports of grain prohibited.
 24 May – French forces invest St Omer
 20 June – Battle of Kallo
 16 July – Siege of Saint-Omer lifted
 26 August – Dutch siege of Geldern lifted
 16 September – Jesuit College in Brussels stages Conversio S. Augustini

Publications
Relation de tout ce qui s'est passé au siège et prise de Breme (Antwerp, Plantin Press)
 Honorius Vanden Born (pen name of Erycius Puteanus), Sedigh leven, daghelycks broodt (Leuven, Everaert De Witte)
 Jean-Jacques Courvoisier, L'Austriche saincte, ou l'Idée du vrai prélat, tirée de la vie parfaite et innocente de S. Maximilian, apôtre et patron de l'Autriche (Brussels, G. Schoevaerts)

Works of art
 Peter Paul Rubens, Het Pelsken, now in the Kunsthistorisches Museum in Vienna
 Anthony van Dyck, Triple Portrait of Henrietta Maria, now in the Royal Collection (2 parts) and the Memphis Brooks Museum of Art (1 part)

Births
Date uncertain
 Arnold de Jode, engraver
 David Teniers III, painter
 6 February – Philips Erard van der Noot, bishop (died 1730)
 3 June – Jean-Guillaume Carlier, painter (died 1675)

Deaths
Date uncertain
Pieter Brueghel the Younger (born 1564), painter
Andreas de Nole (born 1598), sculptor
Jan Roos (born 1591), painter
 10 March – Cornelis van der Geest (born 1575), merchant
 30 April – Guillaume de Steenhuys (born 1558), magistrate
 6 May – Cornelius Jansen (born 1585), theologian
 22 May – Hendrik van den Bergh (born 1573), nobleman
 5 August – Peter Minuit (born 1580/85), governor of New Netherland
 1 October – Jan Snellinck (born c. 1548), painter

References